Živko Papaz, (born 1968) is a Serbish male paralympic shooter competing in the pistol events. He won a silver medal at the World Shooting Para Sport Championships 2019 in Sydney.

Early life
Živko Papaz (born 1968). He injured his spinal cord in 1992 while serving in the military.

External links
Živko Papaz Profile

References

Living people
1968 births
Place of birth missing (living people)
Wheelchair category Paralympic competitors
Paralympic shooters of Serbia
Shooters at the 2008 Summer Paralympics
Shooters at the 2012 Summer Paralympics
Shooters at the 2016 Summer Paralympics
Shooters at the 2020 Summer Paralympics